Deng Jiaxing (born 19 October 2000) is a Chinese footballer currently playing as a forward for Jiangxi Beidamen.

Career statistics

Club
.

References

2000 births
Living people
Chinese footballers
Association football forwards
Chinese Super League players
Chongqing Liangjiang Athletic F.C. players
21st-century Chinese people